Monika Feldmann (born 5 May 1951) is a German former figure skater who represented West Germany. She is a two-time national champion (1967–68) and placed 10th at the 1968 Winter Olympics in Grenoble, France. She also competed at four ISU Championships; her best result, 6th, came at the 1967 Europeans in Ljubljana, Yugoslavia.

Competitive highlights

References 

1951 births
German female single skaters
Living people
Sportspeople from Frankfurt
Figure skaters at the 1968 Winter Olympics
Olympic figure skaters of Germany